The Chinese Garden (German: Chinagarten Zürich) is a Chinese garden in the Swiss city of Zürich. It is a gift from Zürich's Chinese partner town Kunming, dedicated to the Three Friends of Winter.

Location and history 
Zürich's Chinese garden is located in the city's Seefeld quarter, next to the Pavillon Le Corbusier between Blatterwiese and Bellerivestrasse and near to the Zürichhorn peninsula on the right shore of Zürichsee. Ending winter season, the garden will be opened on March 18 to October 18, daily from 11:00 (am) to 19:00 (7 pm), even on Sundays and public holidays. Verkehrsbetriebe Zürich tram lines 2 and 4, together with bus line 33, serve nearby stops at Höschgasse or Fröhlichstrasse, whilst bus lines 912 and 916 run from Bellevue to Chinagarten.

The garden is a gift by Zürich's Chinese partner town Kunming, as thanks for Zürich's technical and scientific assistance in the development of the Kunming city drinking water supply and drainage. From May to October 1993, it was built under the direction of the Zürich garden department, in cooperation by garden experts and craftsmen from Kunming and Zürich, paid by Zürich city administration. Its official inauguration was in spring 1994, under participation of the now former mayor of Kunming City and Zürich's Josef Estermann. As from 2010 maintenance and operation are provided by Grün Stadt Zürich, the City of Zürich's Office of Parks and Open Spaces being a service of the Civil Engineering and Waste Management Department.

Landscaping and buildings 

The garden covers an exactly rectangular terrain, surrounded by a low wall. Its central element is a pond with a small island.

The surrounding wall separates the outer mundane world from art, an ideal microcosm in the garden inside – offers protection against unwanted visitors, too. The wall has on three sides windows, with barred bamboo and lotus flower tiles. Eaves and final bricks as well as the frieze bear small sculptural figures, representing the Chinese dragon of clouds. Wall corners and wall's top adorns the second of the nine dragon sons, Chiwen dragon.

The main portal (entrance) is emblazoned with a calligraphy on a golden plate, meaning China Garden. Nine nail rows and the red color of the gate originally were reserved for the emperor. In China's Yunnan province, for 300 years they have been an essential architectural element of garden plants. The second door was originally named the second-last gate of the Imperial Court's inner rooms. The carved panels on both sides, are excerpts from Chinese tales. The artificial mountain represents the meaning of landscape – «Mountain und Water» – and is contrasting Yin and Yang. Rock formations are the bones in the body, focusing the garden. They also are sharing space and draw the viewer's gaze.

A bridge is connecting the pavilion's island and the inner garden, reminding the island of immortals. The circular pavilion embodies the middle, and so the fifth cardinal direction in the culture of China. His inscriptions refer to the water as a symbol of friendship between the cities of Kunming and Zürich. The hectagon pavilion suggests lofty heights and snow drift in winter. His carvings are full of allegories: Phoenix as symbol of empress, and flowers as well as a symbol of female beauty. The pavilion's inside is showing symbols of good luck and landscapes. A square pavilion forms the entrance to the galleries and to the water palace. Its entrance shows two golden Phoenix'. A carved archway is devoted to the spring, a magpie and plum blossoms announce the newly waked life. Open galleries are adorned by more than 500 still lifes and landscapes. Its carved arche beams are a particular feature of the gardens of Yunnan. A short  winding path symbolizes abundance and harmony.

The water palace is the heart of the Chinese garden. The painting of its exterior walls, doors and windows is deliberately kept simple, so that visitors are able to concentrate to the inner qualities of the building. Its terrace opens to the water surface, showing all important elements of the garden, its rear garden is called garden of shadows.

Plants and water world 
The garden is an expression of one of the main themes of Chinese culture, the «Three Friends of Winter» – three plants that together brave the cold season – pine, bamboo and plum blossom. The inscriptions and paintings point to the uniqueness of the culture of Yunnan and its influences from various ethnic groups. Trees and flowers represent the source of feelings and aspirations. In Zürich's Chinese garden, the local poplars are integrated in the overall design. The pond is lined with willows, as symbol of pure water and holyness. Also important are four ginkgos between the open gallery and the northern wall. Bamboo is representing a forest, with its deep unique sound when wind is blowing. Pine symbolizes the male principle among the trees and a long life. The «Three Friends of Winter's» third part is the plum blossom, beginning to bloom in late winter, and therefore a joyful symbol of spring.

Water is the central element, as a symbol of friendship between Kunming and Zurich. Entering the garden, the pond opens our view to all important elements of the garden.

References

External links 

 Chinagarten Zürich on City of Zürich administration website
 Panoramics and further information on swisspanorams.ch
 3D Google Earth model of pavilion.

Buildings and structures in Zürich
Parks in Zürich
Botanical gardens in Switzerland
Chinese gardens
China–Switzerland relations
District 8 of Zürich